Staplehurst can mean:
 Staplehurst in England
 RAF Staplehurst, a World War II airfield in England
 Staplehurst railway station
 Staplehurst rail crash, a railway accident in 1865
 Staplehurst, Nebraska, a small village in the United States
 Staplehurst, Alberta, a community in Canada